was a Japanese Busshi (sculptor of Buddha statue) of Kamakura period, known alongside Unkei. Because many busshi of the school have a name including kei (慶), his school is called Kei-ha (Kei school). Kaikei being also called Annami-dabutsu, his style is called Anna-miyō (Anna style) and is known to be intelligent, pictorial and delicate. Most of his works have a height of about three shaku, and there are many of his works in existence.

Primary work 
Amitabha Triad in Jōdo-ji in Ono (1195) - National Treasure of Japan. Most important work. Height: 24.6 ft
Hachiman in Tōdai-ji (1201) - National Treasure of Japan.
Nio(Agyō) in Tōdai-ji (1203) - National Treasure of Japan. Joint production with Unkei and 13 assistant sculptors.
Mahamayuri in Kinpusen-ji (1200) - Important Cultural Property of Japan.
Maitreya in Sanbō-in (1192) - Important Cultural Property of Japan.
Vairocana in Ishiyama-dera (1194) - Important Cultural Property of Japan.

References

External links
Bridge of dreams: the Mary Griggs Burke collection of Japanese art, a catalog from The Metropolitan Museum of Art Libraries (fully available online as PDF), which contains material on Kaikei (see index)

Japanese sculptors
Kei school